Arenicolites is a U-shaped ichnotaxon (trace fossil) dating from Ediacaran times onwards in South Australia. The trace shown by this fossil, is a pair of closely spaced circles on a bedding plane.  In vertical section the traces are U or J shaped. They appear to be burrows made by a kind of worm.

References

Trace fossils
Ediacaran life